Tatiana Yadira Suarez Padilla (born December 19, 1990) is an American professional mixed martial artist with a background in wrestling who competes in the Ultimate Fighting Championship (UFC). She was the strawweight tournament winner in the 23rd season of The Ultimate Fighter reality show. As of March 7, 2023, she is #12 in the UFC women's strawweight rankings.

Background
Suarez has Mexican ancestry. She started wrestling before her fourth birthday, as her older brother wrestled and she insisted that her mother let her wrestle too. She graduated from Northview High School before attending Lindenwood University. She is a two-time bronze medalist in the world championships of freestyle wrestling.

While training for the 2012 Summer Olympics in London, Suarez suffered a neck injury, which derailed her Olympic aspirations. An MRI and CAT scan not only revealed a bothersome disc in her neck, but a cancerous growth on her thyroid. Suarez underwent radiation therapy and had her thyroid and several lymph nodes removed. After successful treatment, her thyroid cancer was gone and she eventually began to train again. Suarez started practicing Brazilian jiu-jitsu, which led her to discovering mixed martial arts.

Mixed martial arts career

Early career
Suarez began training MMA in 2013 and made her amateur debut in February 2014 defeating Elizabeth Rodriguez by TKO in the first round. She fought again only one month later and defeated Jessica Pryor by unanimous decision before deciding to turn pro.

Suarez made her successful professional MMA debut in July 2014 in the Gladiator Challenge promotion defeating Tyra Parker by unanimous decision. She returned in April 2015 and submitted Carolina Alvarez by armbar in the first round. She made her final appearance for the promotion in August 2015 defeating Arline Coban by TKO in the second round. This victory earned her the Gladiator Challenge championship in the California State Championship Series.

The Ultimate Fighter 23
Suarez was chosen as a participant on the 23rd season of the reality show The Ultimate Fighter. In her fight to get into the house she defeated Chel-c Bailey by unanimous decision. Her dominant performance caused her to be selected as the number one overall pick by coach Cláudia Gadelha. In the quarter-finals she faced Joanna Jędrzejczyk's number one pick and Invicta FC veteran JJ Aldrich. She submitted Aldrich in the second round by rear naked choke, advancing her to the semi-finals. In her third fight she faced Team Claudia teammate Kate Jackson. She submitted Jackson in the first round by guillotine choke and advanced to the live finale.

Ultimate Fighting Championship
Suarez faced Team Claudia teammate Amanda Cooper in the finals on July 8, 2016 at The Ultimate Fighter 23 Finale. She won the fight by D'Arce choke in the first round to become the strawweight tournament winner. This win earned her the Performance of the Night bonus.

However, Suarez pulled out of the fight on November 23 citing injury and was replaced by JJ Aldrich.

Suarez faced Viviane Pereira on November 11, 2017 at UFC Fight Night: Poirier vs. Pettis. She won the fight via unanimous decision.

Suarez faced Alexa Grasso on May 19, 2018 at UFC Fight Night 129. She won the fight via a rear-naked choke in round one.

Suarez faced Carla Esparza on September 8, 2018 at UFC 228. She won the fight via TKO in the third round.

Suarez faced Nina Ansaroff on June 8, 2019 at UFC 238. She won the fight by unanimous decision.

Suarez was expected to return from an extended hiatus and face Roxanne Modafferi in a flyweight bout on September 25, 2021 at UFC 266. However, Suarez was pulled from the event due to injury, and she was replaced by Taila Santos.

After a three-and-a-half year hiatus, Suarez returned to face Montana De La Rosa in a flyweight bout on February 25, 2023 at UFC Fight Night 220. She won the fight via a guillotine choke submission in round two. This win earned her the Performance of the Night bonus.

Championships and accomplishments

Mixed martial arts
 Ultimate Fighting Championship
 The Ultimate Fighter: Team Joanna vs. Team Cláudia Strawweight winner.
Performance of the Night (Two times) 
 Gladiator Challenge
 Gladiator Challenge Flyweight Champion (one time)

Mixed martial arts record

|-
|Win
|align=center|9–0
|Montana De La Rosa
|Submission (guillotine choke)
|UFC Fight Night: Muniz vs. Allen
|
|align=center|2
|align=center|2:51
|Las Vegas, Nevada, United States
|
|-
|Win
|align=center|8–0
|Nina Ansaroff
|Decision (unanimous)
|UFC 238 
|
|align=center|3
|align=center|5:00
|Chicago, Illinois, United States
|
|-
|Win
|align=center|7–0
|Carla Esparza
|TKO (punches and elbows)
|UFC 228 
|
|align=center|3
|align=center|4:33
|Dallas, Texas, United States
|
|-
|Win
|align=center|6–0
|Alexa Grasso
|Submission (rear-naked choke)
|UFC Fight Night: Maia vs. Usman
|
|align=center|1
|align=center|2:44
|Santiago, Chile
|
|-
|Win
|align=center|5–0
|Viviane Pereira
|Decision (unanimous)
|UFC Fight Night: Poirier vs. Pettis
|
|align=center|3
|align=center|5:00
|Norfolk, Virginia, United States
|
|-
|Win
|align=center|4–0
|Amanda Cooper
|Submission (D'Arce choke)
|The Ultimate Fighter: Team Joanna vs. Team Cláudia Finale
|
|align=center|1
|align=center|3:43
|Las Vegas, Nevada, United States
|
|-
|Win
|align=center|3–0
|Arline Coban
|TKO (punches)
|Gladiator Challenge: California State Championship Series
|
|align=center|2
|align=center|0:48
||San Jacinto, California, United States
|
|-
|Win
|align=center|2–0
|Carolina Alvarez
|Submission (armbar)
|Gladiator Challenge: California State Championship Series
|
|align=center|1
|align=center|2:01
|San Jacinto, California, United States
|
|-
|Win
|align=center|1–0
|Tyra Parker
|Decision (unanimous)
|Gladiator Challenge: Night of the Champions
|
|align=center|3
|align=center|5:00
|Rancho Mirage, California, United States
|

|-
|Win	
|align=center|3–0
| Kate Jackson
| Submission (guillotine choke)
|rowspan=3 |The Ultimate Fighter: Team Joanna vs. Team Cláudia
|  (airdate)
|align=center|1
|align=center|2:52	
|rowspan=3 |Las Vegas, Nevada, United States
|
|-
|Win
|align=center|2–0
| JJ Aldrich
| Submission (rear-naked choke)
| (airdate)
|align=center|2
|align=center|3:14 
|
|-
|Win
|align=center|1–0
| Chel-c Bailey
| Decision (unanimous)
| (airdate)
|align=center|2
|align=center|5:00
|

|-
| Win
|align=center| 2–0
| Jessica Pryor
| Decision (unanimous)
| Spartan Spar Promotions
| 
|align=center| 3
|align=center| 2:00
| Inglewood, California, United States
|
|-
| Win
|align=center| 1–0
| Elizabeth Rodriguez
| TKO (punches)
| Armoured Wings 14
| 
|align=center| 1
|align=center| 1:19
| Los Angeles, California, United States
|

Wrestling record 
{| class="wikitable sortable" style="font-size:80%; text-align:left;"
|-
! Res.
! Record
! Opponent
! Score
! Date
! Event
! Location
|-
! style=background:white colspan=8 | 
|-
| Win
| style="text-align:center;"|10–4
| align=left |  Maria Gurova
| Fall
| rowspan=5|September 9, 2010
| rowspan=5|2010 World Championship
| rowspan=5|  Moscow
|-
| Win
| style="text-align:center;"|9–4
|  Um Ji-eun
| 1–0, 5-4
|-
| Loss
| style="text-align:center;"|8–4
|  Saori Yoshida
| 0–3, 0–7
|-
| Win
| style="text-align:center;"|8–3
|  Ana Maria Pavăl
| 1–3, 3–3, 6–0
|-
| Win
| style="text-align:center;"|7–3
|  Zalina Sidakova
| 2–0, 7–4
|-
! style=background:white colspan=8 | 
|-
| Loss
| style="text-align:center;"|6–3
|   Alena Filipava
| 2–5, 0–3
| rowspan=4| September 24, 2009
| rowspan=4|2009 World Championships
| rowspan=4|  Herning
|-
| Loss
| style="text-align:center;"|6–2
|  Sona Ahmadli
| 0–1, 1–2
|-
| Win
| style="text-align:center;"|6–1
|  Geeta Phogat
| Fall
|-
| Win
| style="text-align:center;"|5–1
|  Gudrun Høie
| 3–0, 6–0
|-
! style=background:white colspan=8 | 
|-
| Win
| style="text-align:center;"|4–1
|  Ana Maria Pavăl
| 5–4
| rowspan=6|October 11, 2008
| rowspan=6|2008 World Championship
| rowspan=6|  Tokyo
|-
| Loss
| style="text-align:center;"|3–1
|  Tetyana Lazareva
| 2–5
|-
| Win
| style="text-align:center;"|3–0
|  Tatyana Grigorieva
| 5–2
|-
| Win
| style="text-align:center;"|2–0
|  Rivera Velazquez
|8–1
|-
| Win
| style="text-align:center;"|1–0
|  Sofia Poumpouridou
| 6–1

See also
 List of current UFC fighters
 List of female mixed martial artists
 List of undefeated mixed martial artists

References

External links
 
 
 

1990 births
Living people
American female sport wrestlers
American practitioners of Brazilian jiu-jitsu
Female Brazilian jiu-jitsu practitioners
Mixed martial artists from California
American mixed martial artists of Mexican descent
American female mixed martial artists
Strawweight mixed martial artists
Mixed martial artists utilizing freestyle wrestling
Mixed martial artists utilizing Brazilian jiu-jitsu
People from Covina, California
World Wrestling Championships medalists
American sportspeople of Mexican descent
Ultimate Fighting Championship female fighters
21st-century American women